Muhammad Arshad Misbahi, or Allama Maulana Hafiz Imam Muhammad Arshad al-Misbahi (born 1968, India) is the Chair of AKSA (Al-Karam Scholars Association) and has been serving at Manchester Central Mosque Victoria Park since 1997 as the Khatib, Imam and Headteacher. He is a graduate from the Islamic Seminary Al Jamiatul Ashrafia of India. He is considered by many to be among st the knowledgeable scholars of his time.

Biography
Muhammad Arshad Misbahi comes from the family of Sufi Barelvi in India. His father, Shaykh Hafiz Muhammad Miyan Maleg, has been serving Islam for the last three decades in Birmingham and was the former Imam and Khateeb at Oldbury Jamia Masjid in Birmingham.  
Imam Muhammad Arshad began his studies at Jamia Al-Karam where he studied under Shaykh Muhammad Imdad Hussain Pirzada and Abu’l-In’am ‘Allama ‘Abd al-Bari. Later he travelled to India and Pakistan to pursue further and higher education.  In Pakistan, he studied with the late Diya’ al-Ummat, Justice Shaykh Muhammad Karam Shah al-Azhari and in India, he studied at al-Jami’a al-Ashrafiyya at Mubarakpur.
Upon his return from Pakistan, he began teaching and serving as head of religious studies at Jamia Al-Karam. He completed Tahfeez-ul-Qur’an in Bradford.

He is the founder and patron of the Sunni Society at the University of Nottingham. He has extensively traveled to many countries delivering lectures and seminars.
In 2001, he was awarded the ad-Dir’ul ur-Mumtaz award from the Al-Azhar University of Cairo, Egypt.

His views
Describing the anti Islam movie, he said that (movie) is "against Islam, against the messenger of Islam, and against the teachings of Islam" and he said "I have four children. My parents are both alive. But I am here to say I love my prophet more than I love my children. I love my prophet more than I love my own self."

He was among the signatories of a letter written to British PM to support the refugees arrival in the U.K. 
As people of faith, we call on your Government urgently to revise its policy towards refugees. The best of this country is represented by the generosity, kindness, solidarity and decency that Britain has at many times shown those fleeing persecution, even at times of far greater deprivation and difficulty than the present day., the letter said.

References

External links
Gateway To Divine Mercy
Manchester Central Mosque, Victoria Park
Arshad Misbahi

Living people
1968 births
Sunni imams
Barelvis
Hanafis